Dominique Dussault is a French singer.

She represented Monaco in the Eurovision Song Contest 1970 with the song Marlène. With 5 points, she came in 8th position.

Discography

Albums 

 Ave Maria (1969)
 Marlène (1970)
 Mains dans les poches (1982)

Singles 
 "Églantine"
 "Le monsieur"
 "La nuit"

References

French women singers
Eurovision Song Contest entrants of 1970
Eurovision Song Contest entrants for Monaco
1954 births
Living people